Dream Number 29 is the seventh album by Cindy Bullens, released on Blue Rose Records in 2005. This album was produced by Bullens herself and Ray Kennedy. It also includes "Dream #29" with Delbert McClinton, featuring Elton John on piano.

Track listing

"Oriental Silk" 	
"Jellico Highway" 	
"Box of Broken Heart" 	
"Paper & Glass" 	
"Dream 29 (One True Love)" 	
"Mockingbird Hill" 	
"7 Days" 	
"This Ain´t Love" 	
"Too Close to the Sun" 	
"Love Letter from Las Vegas"	
"January Sky"

External links
Cindy Bullens - Dream #29 | Releases | Discogs
Release group “Dream #29” by Cindy Bullens - MusicBrainz
Cidny Bullens - Dream #29 Album Reviews, Songs & More | AllMusic
Dream #29 by Cindy Bullens at CD Baby
George Graham Reviews Cindy Bullens' "Dream #29"
Cindy Bullens - Dream #29 - No Depression

2005 albums